Klębów  is a village in the administrative district of Gmina Ulan-Majorat, within Radzyń Podlaski County, Lublin Voivodeship, in eastern Poland. The village had a population of approximately 118 inhabitants in 2009.

References

Villages in Radzyń Podlaski County